The Southern Military District (Russian: Южный военный округ) is a military district of Russia.

It is one of the five military districts of the Russian Armed Forces, with its jurisdiction primarily within the North Caucasus region of the country, and Russian bases in South Caucasian post-Soviet states. The Southern Military District was created as part of the 2008 military reforms, and founded by Presidential Decree №1144 signed on September 20, 2010, to replace the North Caucasus Military District, and absorbing the military commands of the Black Sea Fleet and Caspian Flotilla. The district began operation on October 22, 2010, under the command of Colonel-General Aleksandr Galkin.

The Southern Military District is the smallest military district in Russia by geographic size. The district contains 15 federal subjects of Russia: Adygea, Astrakhan Oblast, Chechnya, Dagestan, Ingushetia, Kabardino-Balkaria, Kalmykia, Karachay-Cherkessia, Krasnodar Krai, North Ossetia-Alania, Rostov Oblast, Stavropol Krai, Volgograd Oblast, and since the annexation of Crimea in 2014, Crimea and Sevastopol.

The Southern Military District is headquartered in Rostov-on-Don, and its current district commander is Colonel General Sergey Kuzovlev, who has held the position since 23 January 2023. It is considered to be the most effective and competent formation of the Russian military.

History
The Southern Military District was formed on 22 October 2010, according to Presidential Decree of 20 September 2010 № 1144 "On the Military Administrative Division Of the Russian Federation" the Southern Military District was created along with two other new larger military districts: the Central Military District and the Eastern Military District. By order of then Russian Defense Minister Anatoly Serdyukov, on 22 July 2010, interim commanders were named for the new military districts. Thus, the new position of commander of the Southern Military District, was Lieutenant-General Aleksandr Galkin, former Commander of the North Caucasus Military District, with Major-General Nikolai Pereslegin as the chief of staff for the district. Galkin was later promoted to Colonel General soon after his appointment as district commander.

The Southern Military District also directs two Russian military bases in Armenia: the 102nd Military Base in Gyumri, and the 3624th Air Base at the civil-military Erebuni Airport in the capital Yerevan, under the joint control of Armenian and Russian authorities.

In April 2014, Crimea and Sevastopol were added to the Southern Military District following the 2014 Crimean crisis in Ukraine, when they were annexed by Russia. The legal status of Crimea (as the Autonomous Republic of Crimea) and the city of Sevastopol is currently under dispute: Ukraine and the majority of the international community considers them an integral part of Ukraine, while Russia considers them an integral part of Russia, with Crimea (as the Republic of Crimea) and Sevastopol approved as federal subjects of Russian Federation.

In 2016, the District was 98% staffed by contract servicemen.

In November 2020, following the aftermath of the 2020 Nagorno-Karabakh war, Russian military peacekeepers were deployed to Nagorno-Karabakh for securing the Lachin corridor and along the line of contact for at least five years. A military base was set up with its headquarters at Stepanakert and is part of the Southern Military District commanded by First deputy commander of the military district Lieutenant General Rustam Muradov. He was replaced by Deputy military district commander Lieutenant General Alexey Avdeev on 13 May 2021.

District organization

As part of the larger reorganisation, the 49th Army reformed with its headquarters seemingly in the former Institute of Communications of the Strategic Rocket Forces at Stavropol. According to warfare.ru, 49th Army (listed at Stavropol/Maikop) has under control the 7th Military Base (in Abkhazia) and the 8th (former Taman Guards Motor Rifle Division), 33rd Mountain Motor Rifle and 34th separate Mountain Motor Rifle Brigades (Borzoi, Chechniya, Maikop, and Storozhevaya-2), as well as the 66th Communications Brigade.

There are also three Spetsnaz brigades (the 100th, 10th, and 22nd), plus one Russian Airborne Troops unit also stationed in the district: the 7th Guards Mountain Air Assault Division at Novorossiysk (which, in 2021, absorbed the former 56th Guards Airborne Brigade). The Russian Air Force has the 4th Air and Air Defence Forces Army in the district. Also under the district's control are the Navy's Black Sea Fleet and Caspian Flotilla, including their respective air and Naval Infantry components, including - in the case of the Black Sea Fleet - the 22nd Army Corps.

In early 2017, the reformation of the 8th Guards Combined Arms Army, successor to the Soviet 8th Guards Army, began within the Southern Military District. The army's headquarters is located at Novocherkassk and it is to include the 150th Motor Rifle Division and the 20th Guards Motor Rifle Division. The first phase of its formation was completed in June 2017.

The 58th Combined Arms Army comprising two further motorized rifle divisions, plus other army level units and the 4th Guards Military Base in South Ossetia is the third army-level formation in the District.

Component units 

 175th Luninets-Pinsk Order of Alexander Nevsky Twice Red Star Headquarters Brigade (Aksay)
 176th Communications Brigade (Territorial) (Rassvet)
 11th Guards Kingisepp Red Banner Order of Alexander Nevsky Engineering Brigade (Kamensk-Shakhtinsky)
 28th NBC Defence Brigade (Kamyshin)
 439th Rocket Artillery Brigade (Znamensk)
 1270th Electronic Warfare Center (Kovalevka)
 37th Railway Brigade (Russian Railway Troops) (Volgograd)
 39th Railway Brigade (Krasnodar)
 333rd Railway Pontoon Bridge Battalion (Volgograd)
 Mountain Training Center of the Armed Forces (Baksan)
 54th Training Center of Intelligence Units (Vladikavkaz)
 27th Training Center of Railway Troops (Volgograd)
 102nd Military Base (Gyumri, Armenia)
76th Motorized Brigade	(Gyumri, Armenia)
73rd Motorized Brigade	(Yerevan, Armenia)
988th Air Defense Regiment (Gyumri, Armenia)
 Unnamed Military Base in (Stepanakert, Nagorno-Karabakh, Azerbaijan)

58th Army (Vladikavkaz)
42nd Guards Motor Rifle Division (Shali, Khankala, Borzoy)
19th Motor Rifle Division (Vladikavkaz) (expanded from Brigade to Division strength in 2020-22 period; planned to re-equip with T-90M main battle tanks)
503rd Motorized Rifle Regiment (equipping with BTR-82A armored personnel carriers as of 2021)
136th Guards Motor Rifle Brigade (Buynaksk)
12th Rocket Brigade (Mozdok)  
291st Artillery Brigade (Troitskaya)
67th Anti-Aircraft Rocket Brigade (Volgograd/Beketovskaya, Volgograd Oblast)
34th C3 Brigade (Vladikavkaz)
 4th Guards Military Base in (Dzhava-Tskhinval, South Ossetia, Georgia) Reported subordinate to 58th Army
Note: the 42nd Guards Motor Rifle Division, reforming from late 2016 in Chechniya, is drawn from the 8th Guards, 17th, and 18th Guards Motor Rifle Brigades

8th Combined Arms Army (Novocherkassk)
 150th Motor Rifle Division (Novocherkassk)
 103rd Motorized Rifle Regiment (Kadamovskiy and Kuzminka, Rostov Oblast)
 163rd Tank Regiment (Kuzminka, Rostov Oblast)
 102nd Motorized Rifle Regiment (Persianovskiy, Rostov Oblast)
 68th Tank Regiment (Persianovskiy, Rostov Oblast)
 174th Reconnaissance Battalion (Persianovskiy, Rostov Oblast)
 381st Artillery Regiment (Persianovskiy and Millerovo, Rostov Oblast)
 Additional Motorized Rifle Regiment reported forming within the Division as of 2018
 933rd Anti-Aircraft Missile Regiment (Millerovo)
 20th Guards Motor Rifle Division (Volgograd and Kamyshin regions; reconstituted from former 20th Motor Rifle Brigade starting in 2021; transformation to complete in 2022)
 242nd Guards Motor Rifle Regiment (Kamyshin, Volgograd Oblast); 
 255th Motor Rifle Regiment (Volgograd); 
 33rd Motor Rifle Regiment (Kamyshin);
 944th Guards Self-Propelled Artillery Regiment; 
 358th Guards Anti-Aircraft Missile Regiment; 
 428th Separate Tank Battalion (near Volgograd; planned to re-equip with T-90M main battle tanks)
 487th Separate Anti-Tank Artillery Battalion.
 464th Rocket Brigade
 47th Missile Brigade (Korenovsk, Krasnodar Krai, established 2021; equipped with Iskander surface-to-surface missiles)
 238th Artillery Brigade (Korenovsk, Krasnodar Krai, established 2021;equipped with 2A65 Msta-B guns and 9K57 Uragan multiple launch rocket systems)
 77th Anti-Aircraft Missile Brigade (Korenovsk; equipped with S-300V4 anti-aircraft missile system)
 Additional SAM brigade reported forming in 2021/22 with Buk-M3 surface-to-air missile systems

1st Army Corps (People's Militia of the Donetsk People's Republic: Народная милиция Донецкой Народной Республики):

 4 Motorized Rifle Brigades (1st, 3rd, 5th, 100th Motorized Rifle Brigades)
 2 Motorized Rifle Regiments (9th and 11th Motorized Rifle Regiments)
 2 special forces battalions (1st and 3rd SF Battalions)
 1 tank battalion (2nd Battalion)
 1 reconnaissance battalion (Sparta Separate Reconnaissance Battalion)
 1 artillery brigade (Kalmius Artillery Brigade)
2nd Guards Luhansk-Severodonetsk Army Corps (People's Militia of the Luhansk People's Republic: Народная милиция Луганской Народной Республики):
 3 Motorized Rifle Brigades (2nd, 4th, 7th Motorized Rifle Brigades)
 1 Motorized Rifle Regiment (6th Motorized Rifle Regiment)
 1 tank battalion (Pantzir Special Mechanized Force)
 1 reconnaissance battalion (Greka Separate Reconnaissance Battalion)
 1 artillery brigade

49th Army (Stavropol/Maykop)
205th Motor Rifle Brigade (Budennovsk)
34th Motorized Rifle Brigade (Mountain) (Storozhevaya-2)
66th C3 Brigade (Stavropol)
227th Artillery Brigade (Maykop)
1st Guards Rocket Brigade (Krasnodar)
439th Guards Perekop Order of Kurozov Rocket Artillery Brigade (Znamensk)
21st NBC Defense Brigade (Kamyshin)
175th C3 Brigade (Aksay)
176th Communications Brigade (Novocherkassk)
154th ECM Brigade OSN	(Izobilny)
Logistic Support Brigade in (Stavropol)
 7th Military Base (Gudauta, Abkhazia, Georgia - subordinate to 49th Army HQ) 'Krasnodar Red Banner, Order of Kutuzov, Order of the Red Star' (former 131st Motor Rifle Brigade)

Airborne Troops
7th Guards Mountain Air Assault Division (at Novorossiysk)

Special forces/Reconnaissance
100th Reconnaissance Brigade (Experimental) (Mozdok-7)
10th Spetsnaz Brigade in (Krasnodar)
22nd Guards Spetsnaz Brigade in (Rostov-on-Don)

Air Force units
4th Air and Air Defence Forces Army

Naval Forces
Black Sea Fleet
 22nd Army Corps, HQ in Sevastopol
 127th Separate Reconnaissance Brigade
 126th Gorlovskaya Separate Coastal Defence Brigade, in Perevalnoe
 8th Separate Coastal Artillery Regiment
 Surface-to-surface missile battalion (Iskander surface-to-surface missiles) reportedly to be added in 2022
 1096th Separate Anti-Aircraft Missile Regiment
 4th Separate CBRN Protection Regiment
11th Coastal Defense Missile-Artillery Brigade (Utash, Krasnodar region)
810th Guards Naval Infantry Brigade
 382nd Naval Infantry Battalion 
68th Fleet Naval Engineers Regiment
133rd Fleet Logistics and Materiel Regiment
4th Fleet NBC Regiment
Caspian Flotilla
 177th Naval Infantry Regiment
 Regimental HQ
 414th and 727th Naval Infantry Battalions
 Tank Battalion
 46th Coastal Defense Missile Artillery Battalion (Surface to Air)

Leadership

Commanders
Colonel-General Aleksandr Galkin (10 December 2010 – June 2016)
Colonel-General (later Army General) Aleksandr Dvornikov (20 September 2016 – 23 January 2023)
Colonel-General Sergey Kuzovlev (23 January 2023 – present)

Chiefs of Staff - First Deputy Commanders
Major General Nikolai Pereslegin (April 2010 – October 2013)
Lieutenant General Andrey Serdyukov (October 2013 – December 2015)
Lieutenant General Alexander Zhuravlyov (December 2015 – March 2017)
Lieutenant General Mikhail Teplinsky (March 2017 – February 2019)
Lieutenant General (later Colonel General) Sergey Kuzovlev (February 2019 – December 2022)

Deputy Commanders
Lieutenant General Andrey Serdyukov (February 2013 – October 2013)
Major General Viktor Astapov (December 2013 – June 2014)
Lieutenant General Andrey Gurulev (August 2016 – 2017)
Lieutenant General Alexander Romanchuk (2017 – 2018)
Lieutenant General Rustam Muradov (December 2018 – present)
Lieutenant General Alexey Avdeev (January 2019 – present)

Commanders of the Russian peacekeeping contingent in Nagorno-Karabakh
Lieutenant General Rustam Muradov (11 November 2020 – 9 September 2021)
Major General Mikhail Kosobokov (9 September 2021 – 25 September 2021)
Lieutenant General Gennady Anashkin (25 September 2021 – 12 January 2022)
Major General Andrey Volkov (12 January 2022 – present)

Notes
 The federal subjects of Crimea and Sevastopol are disputed territories internationally recognized as de jure part of Ukraine but under the de facto administration of the Russian Federation.

See also
 List of military airbases in Russia

References

References 
 
 

Military districts of the Russian Federation
Military units and formations established in 2010
2010 establishments in Russia